Eudonia bronzalis is a moth in the family Crambidae. It was described by William Barnes and Foster Hendrickson Benjamin in 1922. It is found in North America, where it has been recorded from California.

References

Moths described in 1922
Eudonia